Neena Kulkarni (neena Joshi) is an Indian actress. She began her acting career in the 1970s on the Marathi professional stage and Hindi experimental stage, along with fashion shows and modelling simultaneously. She met Pt Satyadev Dubey, her first guru, and went on to be a part of several Hindi productions under his direction. Mohan Rakesh's Adhe Adhure, Shankar Shesh's Mayavi Sarovar and Willie Russell's Educating Rita are a few of her prominent plays.

Dr. Vijaya Mehta chose her to play Shabbo in Anil Barve's Hamidabai Chi Kothi in 1978, and thus began her long journey with Bai into the remarkable world of Marathi theatre with Mahasagar and Savitri. She continues to assist Bai in her workshops. Mahasagar, Akasmat, Dhyani Mani, Vatvat Savitri, Dehabhaan, Prem Patra and Chaapa Kaata are some more of her successful award-winning (Natya Darpan, State Awards, Natya Parishad recognition) Marathi plays.

She directed the play Mahasagar in 2011, Educating Rita, Mahatma Versus Gandhi and Wedding Album - English plays. Her prominent feature films are Savat Mazi Ladki (state award best actress) Aai, Uttarayan, Shevri (for which she won the National Award and PIFF award as producer) Sari Var Sari (State award best supporting) and Bioscope: Dil-E-Naadan (Filmfare Best Supporting Actress). Badal, Nayak, Paheli, Guru, Hungama, Rann, Phir Bhi Dil Hai Hindustani, Mere Yaar Ki Shaadi Hai, Hasee Toh Phasee and Ghayal: Once Again are some of the other Hindi films she has acted in.

She is a column writer for Loksatta, called Antarang. She wrote for 3 years, and has been published as a book by the same name. Her prominent advertising commercials include Cadbury, Surf Excel, Parachute, Paytm, Mother Dairy and Maggie Masala. Her latest television show Yeh Hai Mohabattein recently completed 6 years of telecast. International projects : The Best Exotic Marigold Hotel, Rani (an 8 part series in the French language telecast on channel France Deux) Noces, a French Film shot in Luxembourg and premiered in Paris in Feb 2017. Her latest foray into digital content through a web series Breathe and short films Cuddly and Maa has won her much appreciation. Her latest release is the Short film Devi.

Neena's latest films in the Marathi language are Mogara Phulala directed by Shravani Deodhar, Kulkarni Chaukatla Deshpande, directed by Gajendra Ahire and Photoprem' directed by Aditya Rathi and Gayatri Patil.(Indian Panorama entry in IFFI and Marathi Competition entry in PIFF).
Her upcoming films include Sachin Kundalkar’s Pondicherry and Mohit Takalkar’s Medium Spicy.
Her latest outing on television is the bio series Swarajya Janani Jijamata wherein Neena Kulkarni had played the title role of this great lady and ruler.

Filmography

Theatre 
 Dehbhaan
 Hamidabai chi Kothi
 Dhyani Manee
 Naagmandal
 Chhapa Kata as Uttara Bhagwat Mahatama Vs Gandhi Educating Rita Mahasagar Vat Vat Savitri Aai ch Ghar Unhacha Prem Patra Doctor Tumhi SuddhaTelevision
 Jeena Isi Ka Naam Hai Kammal as Rinni Sanyal/Raina Bose
 Kayamath Mathemagic co-host with Benjamin Gilani on Doordarshan
 Baa Bahoo Aur Baby as Asha
 Meri Maa as Pratibha's mother-in-law
 Ek Packet Umeed-present as Ambika aka MaiDevyani as Manjula
 Yeh Hai Mohabbatein as Madhavi "Madhu" Iyer: Vishwa's wife; Vandita and Ishita's mother; Mihika's aunt (2013–2019)
 Adhuri Ek Kahani Ados Pados as Champakali
 Swarajya Janani Jijamata as Rajmata Jijabai
 Raja Shivchatrapati as Badi Begum
 Saarrthi as Kumud Goenka/Baisa
 Breathe as Juliet Mascarenhas
 The Kapil Sharma Show to promote DeviSwamini as Tarabai
 Unpaused: Naya SafarProduction
Kulkarni has produced the following Marathi films
 2006 - Shevri''

References

External links

 
 
 

Living people
Actresses from Pune
Marathi people
Actresses in Marathi cinema
Actresses in Hindi cinema
Indian film actresses
Indian soap opera actresses
Actresses in Urdu cinema
Actresses in Hindi television
20th-century Indian actresses
21st-century Indian actresses
Year of birth uncertain
Actors from Mumbai
Year of birth missing (living people)